= Stephen Reder =

American researcher

Stephen M. Reder
- Citizenship: American
- Occupations: Applied linguist, education researcher
- Title: Professor Emeritus of Applied Linguistics
- Awards: Literacy Leadership Award

Academic background
- Education: Stanford University (A.B.); Rockefeller University (Ph.D.)
- Thesis: (1977)

Academic work
- Discipline: Adult literacy and numeracy Practice Engagement Theory; Digital literacy Lifelong learning Adult basic education evaluation
- Sub-discipline: Adult literacy Numeracy; Digital literacy Second-language acquisition
- Institutions: Portland State University
- Notable works: Longitudinal Study of Adult Learning; Practice Engagement Theory

Stephen M. Reder is an American applied linguist and education researcher. He is professor emeritus of applied linguistics at Portland State University. His research focuses on adult literacy and numeracy development, second-language acquisition, digital literacy, lifelong and life-wide learning, and the evaluation of adult basic education programs. He is best known as the principal investigator of the Longitudinal Study of Adult Learning (LSAL) and for developing Practice Engagement Theory (PET), a framework linking adults' literacy and numeracy proficiencies to their engagement in everyday literacy practices.

== Early life and education ==
He earned an A.B. from Stanford University and a Ph.D. from Rockefeller University in 1977. His doctoral research was conducted in rural West Africa. Following completion of his doctorate, he conducted comparative ethnohistorical research on literacy development in indigenous and immigrant communities in Alaska and the mainland United States before joining Portland State University.

== Academic career ==
Reder served as a faculty member in the Department of Applied Linguistics at Portland State University, where he held leadership roles and directed or co-directed the Literacy, Language & Technology Research Group (LLTR). He is listed among the department's emeritus faculty.

From the 1990s onward, Reder served as principal investigator or senior investigator on multiple nationally and internationally funded research projects examining adult literacy, English for Speakers of Other Languages (ESOL), digital literacy, and workforce pathways. His most prominent project, the Longitudinal Study of Adult Learning (LSAL), was a decade-long panel study of more than 1,000 adult learners, primarily early school leavers, examining changes in literacy and numeracy, learning activities, program participation, and social and economic outcomes. Findings from LSAL have been widely cited in adult education research, policy, and practice.

Reder also contributed to applied research and demonstration programs in technology-based instruction, digital inclusion, and adult ESOL education, including community-based blended learning initiatives and lab-school models. His contributions to the field have been recognized with a Literacy Leadership Award from a coalition of literacy organizations.

== Research and contributions ==
Reder's research integrates large-scale longitudinal quantitative studies, program evaluation, qualitative research, and theory development to examine how adults develop literacy, numeracy, and digital skills across the life course. His major contributions include:

- Adult learning trajectories: Through LSAL, Reder produced longitudinal evidence on patterns of change in adult literacy and numeracy and the relationship between formal program participation, everyday practices, and long-term outcomes. The study challenged assumptions about short-term instructional participation producing immediate standardized proficiency gains.
- Practice Engagement Theory (PET): Reder and collaborators articulated PET, which proposes that adult literacy and numeracy proficiencies develop largely through sustained engagement in meaningful everyday practices, and that increasing such engagement can lead to measurable skill gains.
- Digital literacy and ICT skills: His research examined how underserved adults acquire information and communication technology (ICT) skills, the role of blended learning environments, and the interaction between digital practices, language learning, and labor market participation.
- Policy and program evaluation: Reder authored evaluation reports and policy briefs emphasizing methods for linking adult education participation to long-term social and economic outcomes, including the use of administrative data.

== Selected publications ==
- Vogel, S., & Reder, S. (eds.). Adult Literacy, Education and Learning Disabilities. Baltimore: Paul H. Brookes Publishing, 1998.
- Reder, S., & Bynner, J. (eds.). Tracking Adult Literacy and Numeracy Skills: Findings from Longitudinal Research. Routledge, 2009.
- Reder, S. (2012). The Longitudinal Study of Adult Learning (LSAL): Project reports and briefings.
- Reder, S. (2019). "Numeracy imprisoned: Skills and practices of incarcerated adults in the United States." ZDM Mathematics Education.
- Reder, S., Gauly, B., & Lechner, C. (2020). "Practice makes perfect: Practice engagement theory and the development of adult literacy and numeracy proficiency." International Review of Education.
- Reder, S. (2020). "A lifelong and life-wide framework for adult literacy education." Adult Literacy Education: The International Journal of Literacy, Language and Numeracy.
- Wicht, A., Reder, S., & Lechner, C. (2021). "Sources of individual differences in adults' ICT skills: A large-scale empirical test of a new guiding framework." PLOS ONE.
- Reder, S. (2023). "Reading engagement and wellbeing in Aotearoa New Zealand." PLOS ONE.
